Orazio Talami (1624–September 15, 1705) was an Italian painter of the Baroque period, active mainly in Bologna and Reggio Emilia.

Biography
Talami was born and died in Reggio Emilia.  He was a pupil of the painter Pietro Desani. He may have also spent some years of his youth working with Leonello Spada. He painted a for the presbytery of the Cathedral at Reggio; he painted Cathedra of St Peter for the church of San Prospero in Reggio, a St Francis Xavier and the Redemption of the Blessed Slaves for San Giacomo; a St Phillip Benizzi for the Basilica della Ghiara; a St Joseph for the church of San Giorgio; a St Michele for the church of San Bartolommeo; a St Contardo for the church of San Nazzaro; a St Peter in Chains for the church of San Agostino; and Three Magi for San Filippo Neri in Reggio. He ceased to paint after 1699.

The painters Jacopo Baccarini and Mattia Benedetti were among his pupils.

References

1624 births
1708 deaths
Painters from Bologna
17th-century Italian painters
Italian male painters
18th-century Italian painters
Italian Baroque painters
18th-century Italian male artists